Pottawattamie County is a county located in the U.S. state of Iowa. At the 2020 census, the population was 93,667, making it the tenth-most populous county in Iowa. The county takes its name from the Potawatomi Native American tribe. The county seat is Council Bluffs.

Pottawattamie County is included in the Omaha–Council Bluffs, NE–IA Metropolitan Statistical Area.

Geography
It is the second-largest county in Iowa by area after Kossuth County. Pottawattamie County is located within Iowa's Loess Hills, and was the site of Kanesville along The Mormon Trail

Due to movement of the Missouri River and a Supreme Court ruling, part of the county, Carter Lake, actually lies on the far side of the Missouri River. This part of the county cannot be reached by road without entering Nebraska; no direct bridge exists.

Major highways

 Interstate 29
 Interstate 80
 Interstate 480
 Interstate 680
 Interstate 880
 U.S. Highway 6
 U.S. Highway 59
 U.S. Highway 275
 Iowa Highway 83
 Iowa Highway 92
 Iowa Highway 165
 Iowa Highway 191
 Iowa Highway 192

Adjacent counties

Harrison County (north)
Shelby County (northeast)
Cass County (east)
Montgomery County (southeast)
Mills County (south)
Sarpy County, Nebraska (southwest)
Douglas County, Nebraska (west)
Washington County, Nebraska (northwest)

National protected area
 DeSoto National Wildlife Refuge (part)

Demographics

2020 census
There were 39,852 housing units, of which 37,284 were occupied.

2010 census
There were 39,330 housing units, of which 36,775 were occupied.

2000 census
At the 2000 census, there were 87,704 people, 33,844 households and 23,623 families residing in the county. The population density was 92 per square mile (35/km2). There were 35,761 housing units at an average density of 38 per square mile (14/km2). The racial makeup of the county was 95.98% White, 0.77% Black or African American, 0.37% Native American, 0.48% Asian, 0.02% Pacific Islander, 1.27% from other races, and 1.11% from two or more races. 3.30% of the population were Hispanic or Latino of any race.

There were 33,844 households, of which 32.30% had children under the age of 18 living with them, 53.60% were married couples living together, 11.80% had a female householder with no husband present and 30.20% were non-families. 24.90% of all households were made up of individuals, and 10.00% had someone living alone who was 65 years of age or older. The average household size was 2.54 and the average family size was 3.03.

26.00% of the population were under the age of 18, 9.10% from 18 to 24, 28.60% from 25 to 44, 22.70% from 45 to 64, and 13.70% who were 65 years of age or older. The median age was 36 years. For every 100 females there were 95.50 males. For every 100 females age 18 and over, there were 92.60 males.

The median household income was $40,089 and the median family income was $47,105. Males had a median income of $31,642 vand females $24,243. The per capita income was $19,275. About 6.40% of families and 8.40% of the population were below the poverty line, including 11.00% of those under age 18 and 6.30% of those age 65 or over.

Communities

Cities 

Avoca
Carson
Carter Lake
Council Bluffs
Crescent
Hancock
Macedonia
McClelland
Minden
Neola
Oakland
Treynor
Underwood
Walnut

Unincorporated community
Honey Creek

Census-designated places
Bentley
Loveland
Weston

Townships

Belknap
Boomer
Carson
Center
Crescent
Garner
Grove
Hardin
Hazel Dell
James
Kane
Keg Creek
Knox
Lake
Layton
Lewis
Lincoln
Macedonia
Minden
Neola
Norwalk
Pleasant
Rockford
Silver Creek
Valley
Washington
Waveland
Wright
York

Population ranking
The population ranking of the following table is based on the 2020 census of Pottawattamie County.

† county seat

Law enforcement
Pottawattamie County is served by the Pottawattamie County Sheriff's Office consisting of 51 sworn deputies, 13 reserve deputies, 92 detention officers and eight civilian support staff. Its headquarters is located in Council Bluffs, Iowa.

Politics
Pottawattamie County is a strongly Republican county. The county last backed a Democratic presidential candidate in 1964 as the party won nationally by a landslide, & only voted Democratic in four other elections prior to that. Some recent elections were more competitive, with Barack Obama losing the county in 2008 by less than 1,000 votes. However, Donald Trump won the county by 21% in 2016 and by 17% in 2020.

Education
School districts include:
 Atlantic Community School District
 AHSTW Community School District
 Council Bluffs Community School District
 Glenwood Community School District
 Griswold Community School District
 Lewis Central Community School District
 Missouri Valley Community School District
 Red Oak Community School District
 Riverside Community School District
 Treynor Community School District
 Tri-Center Community School District
 Underwood Community School District

There is also a state-operated school, Iowa School for the Deaf.

Former school districts:
 A-H-S-T Community School District
 Walnut Community School District

See also

National Register of Historic Places listings in Pottawattamie County, Iowa

Notes

References

External links

Pottawattamie County Government's website 
Pottawattamie County Assessor's website

 
Iowa placenames of Native American origin
1848 establishments in Iowa
Iowa counties on the Missouri River
Populated places established in 1848